Jean Harisson Marcelin (born 12 February 2000) is a French professional footballer who plays as a defender for Belgian club Cercle Brugge on loan from Monaco.

Club career
On 3 February 2018, Marcelin signed a professional contract with Auxerre. He made his professional debut for Auxerre in a 1–0 Ligue 2 win over Nancy on 17 August 2018.

In January 2020, Marcelin joined Ligue 1 club Monaco.

On 23 August 2022, Marcelin returned to Cercle Brugge in Belgium on a new loan.

International career
Marcelin debuted for the France U19s in a 4–0 friendly win over the Armenia U19s, a match in which he scored a goal.

References

External links

2000 births
Living people
People from Le Port, Réunion
Footballers from Réunion
French people of Réunionnais descent
French footballers
Black French sportspeople
France youth international footballers
Association football defenders
AJ Auxerre players
AS Monaco FC players
Cercle Brugge K.S.V. players
Ligue 2 players
Championnat National 3 players
Championnat National 2 players
Belgian Pro League players
French expatriate footballers
Expatriate footballers in Belgium
French expatriate sportspeople in Belgium